Puyoô is a commune in the Pyrénées-Atlantiques department in south-western France.

Geography
The town is situated on the Gave de Pau, a river running through the region, and some of the river's tributaries,  including the streams of Lataillard, Espérance and Loulié. Puyoô neighbours the towns of Bellocq  to the south-west and Ramous to the south-east. The local railway station, Gare de Puyoô, opened in 1862. Today, it has approximately 10,300 passengers a year.

Name
Puyoô is derived from the Bearnaise word Pujóu meaning small hill. Pujóu can be further derived from the Latin word podium, meaning height.
People from the town are known in French as Puyolais.

Economy
The town's economy is generally agriculture-oriented.

Culture
Puyoô has a rugby field and tennis courts, as well as a town hall. A community festival is held towards the end of June.

See also
Communes of the Pyrénées-Atlantiques department

References

External links

Main website 

Communes of Pyrénées-Atlantiques